The 1895 Maryland gubernatorial election took place on November 5, 1895.

Incumbent Governor Frank Brown did not seek re-election.

Republican candidate Lloyd Lowndes Jr. defeated Democratic candidate John E. Hurst.

General election

Candidates
John E. Hurst, Democratic, merchant
Lloyd Lowndes Jr., Republican, former U.S. Congressman
Joshua Levering, Prohibition, president of the Baltimore Young Men's Christian Association
Henry F. Andrews, People's and Socialist Labor

Results

References

Gubernatorial
1895
Maryland